Kyauktaw is a town in northern Rakhine State, in the westernmost part of Myanmar. The famous Mahamuni Buddha image was originally situated near Kyauktaw, in the ruins of the old city of Dhanyawadi.

Location 
It is located approximately between latitudes 20° 37' north and 21° 11' north and longitudes 92° 50' east and 93° 88' east from the north of Kaladan River. The Kispanadi Bridge is located at the entrance to Kyauktaw, traversing the Kaladan River.

Area 

Rivers 
 Kaladan River (Kispanadi)
 Pi Chung
 Priang Chung
 Thari Chung
 Pigauk Chung
 Yoo Chung
 Minne Chung
 Ywar Ma Pyin

Climate 
Kyauktaw has three seasons; the monsoon or rainy season is from May to October; the cool season or winter from November to February and the hot season or summer from March to May. The average temperature range during the summer is from 32 to 40 °C. The average rainfall range during the rainy season is from 431 to 482 centimeters. 
There was a flood in July 2011.

Economy 
Kyauktaw has many sugar mills and sugar-cane plantations.

Religious buildings 
 Buddhist monasteries
 Downtown (5)
 Uptown (201)
 Mosques
 Downtown (3)
 Uptown (102)
 Churches
 Downtown (3)
 Uptown (5)
 Hindu temple
 Downtown (1)

References

External links 
 Satellite map at Maplandia.com

Township capitals of Myanmar
Populated places in Rakhine State
Kaladan River